Fille Saint Merced Nombres Cainglet-Cayetano (born January 30, 1990) is a Filipina volleyball player of the Creamline Cool Smashers in the Premier Volleyball League (PVL). Fille also played for the Petron Blaze Spikers in the Philippine Super Liga (PSL) from 2013 to 2016.

Career
Cainglet started playing volleyball in fifth grade with her classmates at St. Scholastica's College Manila. Cainglet enjoyed and excelled in the sport and became a member of the varsity volleyball team of St. Scholastica's College Manila in high school. After graduating from high school, she together with four other blue-chipped high school volleyball players was recruited by Ateneo De Manila University, where she played varsity volleyball for five years and was named team captain of the 2011 Ateneo Lady Eagles Volleyball Team. This group of five recruits were to be later called the Fab 5 by the Ateneo community. Cainglet played Beach Volleyball Republic Christmas Open at the SM Sands by the Bay, December 19–20, 2015 with Denden Lazaro.

In the 2018, Cayetano moved to Creamline Cool Smashers and won the open conference championships.

Personal life
Cainglet married Taguig Mayor Lino Cayetano on December 27, 2013. In May 2014, Cainglet gave birth to the couple's first child, a son named Ino Philip. In August 2016, the couple welcomed their second child, a daughter named Fille Renee. Cainglet gave birth to their third child, a daughter named Lily Saint, in March 2018. Her sister Fille Claudine played varsity basketball for University of the Philippines.

Clubs
  Meralco Power Spikers (2013–2015)
  Petron Blaze Spikers (2013–2016)
  Pocari Sweat Lady Warriors (2017)
  Creamline Cool Smashers (2018–present)

Awards

Individuals
 2011 Shakey's V-League – Season 8 (1st Conference) "Most Improved Player"

Club Team 
 2013 PSL Invitational Conference –  3rd place, with Petron Blaze Spikers
 2014 PSL Grand Prix Conference –  Champions, with Petron Blaze Spikers
 2015 PSL All-Filipino Conference –  Champions, with Petron Blaze Spikers
 2015 PSL Grand Prix Conference –  Runner-up, with Petron Blaze Spikers
 2017 PVL Reinforced Conference –  Champions, with Pocari Sweat Lady Warriors
 2017 PVL Open Conference –  Runner-up, with Pocari Sweat Lady Warriors
 2018 PVL Open Conference –  Champions, with Creamline Cool Smashers
 2019 PVL Open Conference –  Champions, with Creamline Cool Smashers
 2022 PVL Open Conference –  Champions, with Creamline Cool Smashers
 2022 PVL Invitational Conference –  Champions, with Creamline Cool Smashers
 2022 PVL Reinforced Conference -  3rd place, with Creamline Cool Smashers

References

1990 births
Living people
Ateneo de Manila University alumni
Fille
Filipino women's volleyball players
Sportspeople from Bacolod
University Athletic Association of the Philippines volleyball players
Outside hitters
Philippines women's international volleyball players